She Has a Name is a 2016 Canadian drama thriller film directed by Daniel Kooman and Matthew Kooman and written by Andrew Kooman, based on the play of same name by Andrew. The film stars Will Yun Lee, Eugenia Yuan, Teresa Ting, Gil Bellows, and Giovanni Mocibob.

Cast 
 Will Yun Lee
 Eugenia Yuan
 Teresa Ting
 Vanessa Toh
 Gil Bellows
 Giovanni Mocibob
 Deborah Fennelly

Production 
In February 2012, Andrew Kooman was adapting a screenplay version of his play She Has a Name. The idea of a 'stage-to-film adaptation' of the play was also independently suggested by Pat Donnelly of the Montreal Gazette. In 2014, Shari Aspinall, Kooman and his younger brothers, Daniel and Matthew, scouted locations in Cambodia in preparation for the film.

Principal photography on the film began in November 2015 in Bangkok, Thailand and ended on January 22, 2016.

References

External links 
 

2016 films
Canadian thriller drama films
2016 thriller drama films
English-language Canadian films
Films based on Canadian plays
Films shot in Bangkok
2016 drama films
2010s English-language films
2010s Canadian films